Lake Kinkony is a large lake in the northwestern part of Madagascar, in the lower Mahavavy Sud River watershed in Boeny region (former Mahajanga Province). The lake is an important wetland site for birds.

References

Kinkony
Mahajanga Province
Boeny
Ramsar sites in Madagascar
Important Bird Areas of Madagascar